Michiru Castles are a Malawian football (soccer) club based in Blantyre. The club plays in the Malawi Second Division.

In 1977 the team won the TNM Super League.

History

Achievements
Malawi Premiere Division: 1
1977

Performance in CAF competitions
CAF Champions League: 1 appearance
1978 African Cup of Champions Clubs – Preliminary Round

Notable players
 Chikondi Banda
 Ernest Mtawali

References

External links

Football clubs in Malawi
Blantyre